Walter Smith also known as Walter Purula (Perrurle) or Wati Yuritja (2 July 1898 – 14 June 1990) was a legendary Australian bushman from the Arltunga region in the Northern Territory of Australia. He was also a miner, dogger and perhaps the most widely travelled cameleer in Australia who could speak more than 30 languages.

Early life

Smith was born at the Arltunga goldfield and was the eldest of eleven children to William Smith, a goldminer of Welsh descent and an Aboriginal woman Topsy White (Topsy Smith). Although he had no formal education, his father taught him English and his mother and grandmother taught him eastern Arrernte and Arabana languages.

At the age of 12, he accompanied Arrernte people on their last large ceremonial gathering in the Simpson Desert. They travelled with camels to a large clay-pan, where traditional hunting and gathering took place. After severe drought in 1914-15 drought and the 1919 influenza ceremonial gatherings took place on the desert-fringe cattle stations or at the edges of outback towns instead. After the death of his father in 1914, Smith's family moved to Alice Springs with the help of the Hayes family of Undoolya station and police sergeant Robert Stott. In Alice Walter lived with his mother at The Bungalow, a ‘half-caste’ institution.

Smith married Millie Carnegie on 11 February 1929 at the Oodnadatta police station. While he was away on a prospecting journey to the western deserts, government officials removed Millie to Nepabunna Mission in the Flinders Ranges. Smith never saw her again.

Working life

Smith began working with Afghan cameleer Charlie Sadadeen, meeting the train at the railhead at Oodnadatta in South Australia, and taking a load to Alice Springs with a camel team as a teenager. He then worked as a prospector, gem fossicker, dogger (dingo trapper) and miner at Tennant Creek during the 1930s. He took out several mining leases in the Harts Range.

Later life

Smith married Mabel Williams in Alice Springs on 26 January 1961. He was the last of the Red Centre’s cameleers, working into the 1970s. After living with his sister for many years, he then moved to the Old Timers’ Home in 1983. He died on 14 June 1990 and is buried in the Alice Springs Cemetery.

References

1898 births
1990 deaths
Australian miners
Australian prospectors